Maldonado is a Spanish surname. Notable people with the surname include:
Don Hernando Maldonado (Hernán Pérez De Aldana) founder of this surname created after winning a honor duel with a said "Guillaume" or "William" (Possibly either William IX "The Troubadour" Duke of Aquitaine, William II "The Conqueror" Duke Of Normandy, or William the Son of Hugh, "Le Grand" ou "Le Maisné" Count of Vermandois) and hence forcing "The Amorous" King Philip I Of France to "Badly Give" him five golden Fleurs De Lis for his coat of arms in order to spare the said man's Life, which (due to there being three Fleurs De Lis in the Coat of arms of the Royal House of France to symbolize their honor) was a humiliation that implied that Don Hernando's family was more honorable than the Royal House of France. (A), (B), (C), (D), (E)
Juan Guzman Maldonado (born 1948) Chilean Artist 
Abel Maldonado (born 1967), American politician, 47th Lieutenant Governor of California
Alana Maldonado (born 1995), Brazilian Paralympic judoka
 Alonso del Castillo Maldonado, Spanish explorer of the 16th century
Ángel Maldonado (born 1973), Mexican football (soccer) goalkeeper
Candy Maldonado (Cándido Maldonado Guadarrama) (born 1960), Puerto Rican baseball player
 Carlos Maldonado (born 1963), Venezuelan football (soccer) player
Claudio Maldonado (born 1980), Argentinian composer-performer
Claudio Maldonado (born 1980), Chilean football (soccer) player
Estuardo Maldonado (born 1928), Ecuadorian sculptor and painter
Fabio Maldonado (born 1980), Brazilian boxer and mixed martial arts fighter
Francisco Maldonado (1480–1521), leader of the rebel Comuneros in the Revolt of the Comuneros, who was captured and beheaded at the Battle of Villalar, Spain
Francisco José Maldonado (born 1981), Spanish football (soccer) player
Francisco Maldonado da Silva (died 1639), Chilean physician and religious scholar, executed in the Inquisition
Giancarlo Maldonado (born 1982), Venezuelan football (soccer) player
Gonzalo Maldonado (disambiguation), several people
Guillermo Maldonado (pastor) the co-founder of El Rey Jesus
Javier Torres Maldonado (born 1968), Mexican / Italian composer
Jesús E. Maldonado, American geneticist
Joseph Maldonado-Passage (born 1963), American former zoo operator and convicted felon
 Juan Maldonado
 Juan Maldonado (humanist) (1485–1554), Spanish humanist and writer of a.o. Somnium 
 Juan de Maldonado y Ordóñez de Villaquirán (1525–1572), Spanish conquistador in Venezuela and Colombia, founder of San Cristóbal, Venezuela
 Juan de Maldonado (16th century), governor of Cartagena (1554–1555)
 Juan (de) Maldonado (1533–1583), Spanish Jesuit 
 Juan Villanueva Maldonado (16th century), Spanish conquistador and founder of Macas, Ecuador
 Juan Álvarez Maldonado (16th century), Spanish conquistador of Peru, who wrote about Paititi 
 Juan Pacheco Maldonado (16th century), Spanish explorer of Morong, Rizal and Maynila, Philippines
 Juan Maldonado de Villasante (17th century), governor of Costa Rica
 Juan Manuel Maldonado (19th century), Mexican colonel involved in the foundation of Piedras Negras, Coahuila
 Juan Maldonado Waswechia Beltran (1857–1901), Mexican indigenous leader of the Yaqui resistance
 Felix Juan ("Felo") Maldonado (1938–2010), Puerto Rican baseball manager
 Juan L. Maldonado (1948–2018), administrator of Laredo Community College, Texas
 Juan Mayr Maldonado (b. 1952), photographer and ambassador of Colombia to Germany
 Juan Maldonado Jaimez (b. 1982), Brazilian football player
 Juan Carlos Maldonado (b. 1986), Argentinian football player
 Juan Gabriel Maldonado (b. 1990), Paraguayan football player
Kirstin Maldonado (born 1992), an American solo singer, also a vocalist of the American a cappella group Pentatonix
Lourdes Maldonado (born 1973), Spanish journalist
Lourdes Maldonado López (1954–2022), Mexican journalist
María José Maldonado (born 1985), Paraguayan beauty queen and singer
Maria Maldonado (born 1982), American beauty queen
Marisol Maldonado (born 1970?), American fashion model, wife of musician Rob Thomas
Martín Maldonado (born 1986), Puerto Rican professional baseball player
Miguel Mateo Maldonado y Cabrera (1695–1768), indigenous Zapotec painter in New Spain (now Mexico)
Mildred Maldonado (born 2001), Mexican rhythmic gymnast
Nancy L. Maldonado (born 1975), American lawyer
Norman Maldonado (born 1985), Puerto Rican hematologist, former president of the University of Puerto Rico
Pastor Maldonado (born 1985), Venezuelan racing driver
Pedro Vicente Maldonado (1704–1748), Ecuadorian scientist
 Pedro De Jesús Maldonado Lucero (1892-1937), Mexican Saint, Catholic Priest from Chihuahua,  Martyr of the Cristero War
Santiago Maldonado (1989–2017), his death became a political scandal in Argentina
Tomás Maldonado (1922–2018), Argentine painter, designer, and thinker, Scientific Design movement theorist
Tomás Maldonado Cera (born 1971), Colombian serial killer
Víctor Maldonado (born 1939), Venezuelan hurdler

Surnames of Spanish origin
Spanish-language surnames